120347 Salacia, provisional designation , is a large planetoid in the Kuiper belt, approximately 850 kilometers in diameter. As of 2018, it is located 44.8 astronomical units from the Sun, and reaches apparent magnitude 20.7 at opposition.

Salacia was discovered on 22 September 2004, by American astronomers Henry Roe, Michael Brown and Kristina Barkume at the Palomar Observatory in California, United States. It has been observed 124 times, with precovery images back to 25 July 1982. Salacia orbits the Sun at an average distance that is slightly greater than that of Pluto. It was named after the Roman goddess Salacia and has a single known moon, Actaea.

Brown estimated that Salacia is nearly certainly a dwarf planet. However, William Grundy et al. argue that objects in the size range of 400–1,000 km, with densities of ≈ 1.2 g/cm3 or less and albedos less than ≈ 0.2, have likely never compressed into fully solid bodies or been resurfaced, let alone differentiated or collapsed into hydrostatic equilibrium, and so are highly unlikely to be dwarf planets.

Orbit 

Salacia is a non-resonant object with a moderate eccentricity (0.11) and large inclination (23.9°), making it a scattered–extended object in the classification of the Deep Ecliptic Survey and a hot classical Kuiper belt object in the classification system of Gladman et al., which may be the same thing if they are part of a single population that formed during the outward migration of Neptune. Salacia's orbit is within the parameter space of the Haumea collisional family, but Salacia is not part of it, as evidenced by the lack of the strong water-ice absorption bands of members of the collisional family.

Physical characteristics 

Salacia has the lowest albedo of any known large trans-Neptunian object.

Salacia's infrared spectrum is almost featureless, indicating an abundance of water ice of less than 5% on the surface. Its light-curve amplitude is only 3%.

Satellite 

It was discovered on 21 July 2006 by Keith Noll, Harold Levison, Denise Stephens and William Grundy with the Hubble Space Telescope.

Actaea is  magnitudes fainter than Salacia, implying a diameter ratio of 2.98 for equal albedos.

It has been calculated that the Salacia system should have undergone enough tidal evolution to circularize their orbits, which is consistent with the low measured eccentricity, but that the primary need not be tidally locked. The ratio of its semi-major axis to its primary's Hill radius is 0.0023, the tightest trans-Neptunian binary with a known orbit. Salacia and Actaea will next occult each other in 2067.

Name 

This planetoid was named after Salacia, the goddess of salt water and the wife of Neptune. The naming citation was published on 18 February 2011.

The moon's name, Actaea , was assigned on the same date. Actaea is a nereid or sea nymph.

Planetary symbols are no longer much used in astronomy, so Salacia never received a symbol in the astronomical literature. There is no standard symbol for Salacia used by astrologers either. Denis Moskowitz, a software engineer in Massachusetts who designed the symbols for most of the dwarf planets, proposed a stylised hippocamp as the symbol for Salacia, befitting Salacia as Neptune's consort.

See also
List of Solar System objects by size

Notes

References

External links 
 (120347) Salacia at Johnston's Archive
 Salacia: As big as Ceres, but much farther away (Emily Lakdawalla – 2012/06/26)

 
120347
120347
Discoveries by Michael E. Brown
Named minor planets
Binary trans-Neptunian objects
20040922